Simion Bumbar (born 29 March 2005) is a Romanian professional footballer who plays as a goalkeeper for Liga II side CSC 1599 Șelimbăr.

References

External links
 

2005 births
Living people
People from Vișeu de Sus
Romanian footballers
Association football goalkeepers
Liga I players
Liga II players
CS Gaz Metan Mediaș players
CSC 1599 Șelimbăr players